Chrysobothris is a genus of metallic wood-boring beetles in the family Buprestidae. There are at least 690 described species in Chrysobothris.

See also
 List of Chrysobothris species

References

Buprestidae genera